Marian Foik (6 October 1933, in Bielszowice, now Ruda Śląska – 20 May 2005, in Warsaw) was a Polish athlete who mainly competed in the 100 metres.

He competed at the 1964 Summer Olympics held in Tokyo, Japan, participating in the 4 x 100 metre relay. With his team mates Andrzej Zieliński, Wiesław Maniak and Marian Dudziak, he won the silver medal.

References

External links
 

1933 births
2005 deaths
Polish male sprinters
Athletes (track and field) at the 1956 Summer Olympics
Athletes (track and field) at the 1960 Summer Olympics
Athletes (track and field) at the 1964 Summer Olympics
Olympic athletes of Poland
Olympic silver medalists for Poland
Sportspeople from Ruda Śląska
European Athletics Championships medalists
Medalists at the 1964 Summer Olympics
Olympic silver medalists in athletics (track and field)
Legia Warsaw athletes
20th-century Polish people